Irving Penn (June 16, 1917October 7, 2009) was an American photographer known for his fashion photography, portraits, and still lifes.  Penn's career included work at Vogue magazine, and independent advertising work for clients including Issey Miyake and Clinique.  His work has been exhibited internationally and continues to inform the art of photography.

Early life and education
Penn was born to a Russian Jewish family on June 16, 1917, in Plainfield, New Jersey, to Harry Penn and Sonia Greenberg. Penn's younger brother, Arthur Penn, was born in 1922 and would go on to become a film director and producer. Penn attended Abraham Lincoln High School where he studied graphic design with Leon Friend.

Penn attended the Philadelphia Museum School of Industrial Art (now the University of the Arts) from 1934 to 1938, where he studied drawing, painting, graphics, and industrial arts under Alexey Brodovitch. While still a student, Penn worked under Brodovitch at Harper's Bazaar which published several of Penn's drawings.

Career 
Penn worked as a freelance designer for three years taking his first amateur photographs before taking Brodovitch's position as the art director at Saks Fifth Avenue in 1940. Penn remained at Saks Fifth Avenue for a year before leaving to spend a year painting and taking photographs in Mexico and across the US. When Penn returned to New York, Alexander Liberman offered him a position as an associate in Vogue magazine's Art Department. Penn worked on layout for the magazine before Liberman asked him to try photography.

Penn's first photographic cover for Vogue magazine appeared in October 1943. The art department of the Office of War Information in London offered him a job as an "artist-photographer" but he volunteered with the American Field Service instead. After arriving in Naples with a boatload of American troops in November 1944. Penn drove an ambulance in support of the British Eighth Army as it alternately waited out weather and slogged its way north through a miserable winter in the Italian Apennines. In July 1945, he was transferred from Italy to India. He photographed the soldiers, medical operations, and camp life for the AFS, and various subjects while bivouacked in India. He sailed back to New York in November 1945.

Penn continued to work at Vogue throughout his career, photographing covers, portraits, still lifes, fashion, and photographic essays. In the 1950s, Penn founded his own studio in New York and began making advertising photographs.  Over the years, Penn's list of clients grew to include General Foods, De Beers, Issey Miyake, and Clinique.

Penn met Swedish fashion model Lisa Fonssagrives at a photo shoot in 1947. In 1950, the two married at Chelsea Register Office, and two years later Lisa gave birth to their son, Tom Penn, who would become a metal designer. Lisa Fonssagrives died in 1992. Penn died aged 92 on October 7, 2009 at his home in Manhattan.

Photography
Best known for his fashion photography, Penn's repertoire also included portraits of creative greats; ethnographic photographs from around the world; Modernist still-life works of food, bones, bottles, metal, and found objects; and photographic travel essays.

Penn was among the earliest photographers to pose subjects against a simple grey or white backdrop and he effectively used its simplicity.   During his early years at Vogue, the magazine's art director, Penn developed a bold graphic sensibility that complemented Penn's chic images and embodied modern taste. His use of monochromatic backdrops of black, white, or gray allowed him complete control of natural lighting conditions and enhanced the visual simplicity of his photographs.  In an era when elaborate artificial lighting was the norm, his work stood out from the rest and influenced subsequent fashion photography. Expanding his austere studio surroundings, Penn constructed a set of upright angled backdrops, to form a stark, acute corner. Subjects photographed with this technique included John Hersey, Martha Graham, Marcel Duchamp, Pablo Picasso, Georgia O'Keeffe, W. H. Auden, and Igor Stravinsky.

Penn's still life compositions are sparse and highly organized, assemblages of food or objects that articulate the abstract interplay of line and volume. Penn's photographs are composed with a great attention to detail, which continues into his craft of developing and making prints of his photographs. Penn experimented with many printing techniques, including prints made on aluminum sheets coated with a platinum emulsion rendering the image with a warmth that untoned silver prints lacked. His black and white prints are notable for their deep contrast, giving them a clean, crisp look.

While steeped in the Modernist tradition, Penn also ventured beyond creative boundaries. The exhibition Earthly Bodies consisted of series of posed nudes whose physical shapes range from thin to plump; while the photographs were taken in 1949 and 1950, they were not exhibited until 1980.

He continued to capture collections by his favorite designers, such as John Galliano for Dior, Karl Lagerfeld for Chanel, and Christian Lacroix, for Vogue, incorporating these darker themes into his images.

Exhibitions
1975: Irving Penn: Recent Works, Photographs of Cigarettes, Museum of Modern Art, New York
1975: I Platini di Irving Penn: 25 Anni di Fotografia, Galleria Civica d'Arte Moderna, Turin
1975: Irving Penn: Platinum Plates, The Photographers' Gallery, London
1977: Irving Penn: Street Material. Photographs in Platinum Metals, The Metropolitan Museum of Art, New York
1980: Exhibition at the Center for Visual Arts, Oakland, California
1984: Irving Penn, a retrospective, The Museum of Modern Art, New York
1986: Irving Penn: Printemps des arts de Monte Carlo, Monte Carlo
1990: Irving Penn: Master Images, National Museum of American Art and the National Portrait Gallery, Smithsonian Institution, Washington, D.C.
1990: Irving Penn: Platinum Test Material, Center for Creative Photography, University of Arizona
1994: Irving Penn: Collection Privée/Privatsammlung, Musée d'Art et d'Histoire, Fribourg, Switzerland
1995: Irving Penn Photographs: A Donation in Memory of Lisa Fonssagrives-Penn, Moderna Museet, Stockholm
1997: Le Bain: Dancers' Workshop of San Francisco, Maison Européenne de la Photographie, Paris
1997: Irving Penn: A Career in Photography, The Art Institute of Chicago
2001: Irving Penn: Objects (Still Lifes) for the Printed Page, Museum Folkwang, Essen
2002: Dancer: 1999 Nudes by Irving Penn, Whitnew Museum of American Art, New York
2002: Earthly Bodies: Irving Penn's Nudes, 1949–1950, The Metropolitan Museum of Art, New York
2004: Dahomey (1967), The Museum of Fine Arts, Houston
2005: Irving Penn: Platinum Prints, the National Gallery of Art, Washington, D.C.
2008: Close Encounters, Morgan Library & Museum, New York
2009: The Small Trades, J. Paul Getty Museum, Los Angeles: a collection of 252 full-length portraits by Penn from 1950 to 1951
2010: Exhibition at the National Portrait Gallery (London): an exhibit of over 120 portraits of people from the worlds of literature, music and the visual and performing arts
2012: Irving Penn: Diverse Worlds, Museum of Modern Art (Moderna Museet), Malmö, Sweden
2013: Irving Penn: On Assignment, Pace Gallery, New York City, New York.
2015-2016: Irving Penn: Beyond Beauty, career retrospective of 146 photographs at the Smithsonian American Art Museum.
2017: Irving Penn: Centennial, Metropolitan Museum of Art, New York City; Irving Penn - Le Centenaire, Grand Palais, Paris.

Major collections

The Art Institute of Chicago holds the Irving Penn Paper and Photographic Archives, which were donated to the Ryerson and Burnham Libraries and the Department of Photography in 1995. In addition, the Art Institute of Chicago has more than 200 of Penn's fine art prints in its collection, and has mounted several exhibitions of work by the artist including the retrospective Irving Penn: A Career in Photography (1997–1998) which traveled internationally as well as Irving Penn: Underfoot (2013).

The Smithsonian American Art Museum (SAAM) possesses a large collection of Penn's works, including a silver gelatin print of Penn's The Tarot Reader, a photograph from 1949 of Jean Patchett and surrealist painter Bridget Tichenor. In 2013, the museum received 100 images as a gift from the Irving Penn Foundation, significantly increasing the number of Penn's works in the collection to 161 images. The Irving Penn Foundation's gift formed the basis of the exhibition, Irving Penn: Beyond Beauty, which was shown at SAAM before traveling to other museum venues around the United States.

Awards
1987: The Cultural Award from the German Society for Photography (DGPh)

Bibliography
Moments Preserved. 1960
Worlds in a Small Room. 1974. 
Inventive Paris Clothes, 1909–1939. 1977. 
Flowers. 1980. 
Passage. 1991. 
Drawings. 1999. 
The Astronomers Plan a Voyage to Earth. 1999. 
Irving Penn Regards The Work of Issey Miyake. 1999. 
Still Life. 2001. 
A Notebook at Random. 2004. 
Photographs of Dahomey. 2004.

References

Further reading
Irving Penn : A Career in Photography. Colin Westerbeck. 1997. 
Earthly Bodies: Irving Penn's Nudes, 1949-50. By Irving Penn, Maria Morris Hambourg, Metropolitan Museum of Art, 2002. 
Irving Penn: Platinum Prints. Sarah Greenough, David Summers. 2005. 
Irving Penn: Small Trades. 2009. Irving Penn Portraits. 2010. Irving Penn: Beyond Beauty. Merry A. Foresta. Yale University Press, 2015. Irving Penn: Centennial. Maria Morris Hambourg, Jeff L. Rosenheim, Alexandra Dennett, Philippe Garner, Adam Kirsch, Harald E.L. Prins, Vasilios Zatse., New York: Metropolitan Museum of Art/Yale University Press, 2017. Irving Penn: Le Centenaire.'' Paris: Editions de la Réunion des musées nationaux, 2017.

External links

Irving Penn Foundation
Voguepedia Irving Penn
Irving Penn Archives at the Art Institute of Chicago
Irving Penn: Beyond Beauty - online image gallery from 2015 to 2016 Smithsonian American Art Museum exhibition
Irving Penn: Small Trades at the J. Paul Getty Museum

1917 births
2009 deaths
Commercial photographers
Fashion photographers
Food photographers
Interior photographers
American portrait photographers
Photographers from New York (state)
American people of Russian-Jewish descent
Jewish American artists
People from Manhattan
People from Plainfield, New Jersey
20th-century American photographers
21st-century American photographers
20th-century American male artists
21st-century American male artists
Photographers from New Jersey
20th-century American Jews
21st-century American Jews
Abraham Lincoln High School (Brooklyn) alumni
American Field Service personnel of World War II